Inesa Valeriyivna Titova (born 18 March 1976) is a Ukrainian former footballer who played as a defender. She has been a member of the Ukraine women's national team.

References

1976 births
Living people
Women's association football defenders
Ukrainian women's footballers
Sportspeople from Cherkasy
Ukraine women's international footballers
Ukrainian expatriate women's footballers
Ukrainian expatriate sportspeople in Moldova
Expatriate women's footballers in Moldova
WFC Zhytlobud-1 Kharkiv players